George John Edwin Clark (19 March 1834 – 6 February 1907) was an Australian farmer and politician.

Early life
Born in Van Diemen's Land, he was educated in England at Camberwell Collegiate School.

Pastoral life
In 1865 he settled in the Darling Downs in Queensland, where his older brother Charles had been living since 1861. In 1868 the brothers bought the Old Talgai sheep farming station, where George proved to be a very successful breeder of sheep.

In 1868, George Clark commissioned architect Richard George Suter to construct a grand homestead. Talgai Homestead is now listed on the Queensland Heritage Register.

Political life

He served as in the Legislative Assembly of Queensland from 1867 to 1868 as the Member (MLA) for Warwick. The seat was later held from 1871 to 1873 by his brother Charles.

Later life

Clark died in 1907 and was buried in Allora Cemetery.

References 

1834 births
1907 deaths
Members of the Queensland Legislative Assembly
People from the Darling Downs
People educated at Camberwell Collegiate School
19th-century Australian politicians